South Portsmouth is an unincorporated community in Greenup County, Kentucky, United States. Kentucky Route 8 passes through the community.

South Portsmouth was originally called Springville due to the numerous springs in the area. Springville was incorporated as a town on March 3, 1876. The Chesapeake and Ohio Railroad built a track through the community in the early 1900s. Subsequently the name of the community was changed to South Portsmouth, presumably to indicate its location and strengthen its connection with Portsmouth, Ohio, a city of more than 20,000 people.

An Amtrak train station, South Portsmouth-South Shore station, is located just east of South Portsmouth.

South Portsmouth is the site of an 18th-Century Shawnee Indian village called Lower Shawneetown.

Notable person

 Charles Kinney (1850-1918) - Ohio Secretary of State

References

Unincorporated communities in Kentucky
Unincorporated communities in Greenup County, Kentucky
Kentucky populated places on the Ohio River